Juan Costa Climent (born 10 April 1965) is a Spanish politician, who served as Minister of Science and Technology of Spain from September 2003 to April 2004.

References

1965 births
Living people
University of Navarra alumni
Government ministers of Spain
Science ministers